Gitea is a forge software package for hosting software development version control using Git as well as other collaborative features like bug tracking, code review, kanban boards, tickets, and wikis. It supports self-hosting but also provides a free public first-party instance. It is a fork of Gogs and is written in Go. Gitea can be hosted on all platforms supported by Go including Linux, macOS, and Windows. The project is funded on Open Collective.

History 
Gitea was created by Lunny Xiao, who was also a founder of the self-hosted Git service Gogs. He invited a group of users and contributors of Gogs. Though Gogs was an open-source project, its repository was under the control of a single maintainer, limiting the amount of input and speed with which the community could influence the development. Frustrated by this, the Gitea developers began Gitea as a fork of Gogs in November 2016 and established a community-driven model for its development. It had its official 1.0 release the following month, December 2016.

2022
In October 2022 Gitea Limited was formed by Lunny Xiao. The company will offer paid services. The commercial ownership model, as opposed to community/non-profit ownership model, received some resistance and resulted in the Forgejo software fork of Gitea. A major Gitea forge, Codeberg, was also unhappy with the new model and switched to Forgejo.

See also 
 Source control
 Distributed version control
 Self hosting
 Comparison of source code hosting facilities
 Open-source software
 GitHub
 GitLab
 Bitbucket

References

External links 
 
 Official instance
 Code repository on GitHub

2016 software
Version control
Git (software)
Bug and issue tracking software
Free software programmed in Go
Project hosting websites
Project management software
Open-source software hosting facilities
Free project management software
Free and open-source software
Free software websites
Cross-platform free software
Software using the MIT license
Collaborative projects